Leo Castledine (born 20 August 2005) is an English professional footballer currently playing as a midfielder for Chelsea.

Club career
Born in Kingston upon Thames, where he lived only 15 minutes away from the Cobham Training Centre, Castledine started his career with Chelsea, who he had supported growing up. He spent two years with Chelsea before moving to AFC Wimbledon at the age of seven. Growing up, he also played rugby, and was enrolled in the elite academy of professional club Harlequins.

Initially beginning his career with Wimbledon in a more defensive role, he moved up the pitch to operate as a midfielder. Settling into his new role well, he was involved in Wimbledon under-18's pre-season tour of Italy, playing alongside players four years his senior, and went on to make his under-18 debut in 2019 - becoming the youngest Wimbledon player to ever do so.

A year later, in March 2020, he rejoined Chelsea, naming Mason Mount and Jack Grealish as his favourite current players. He signed his first professional contract with The Blues in August 2022, on his seventeenth birthday, and has already been called up to train with the first team.

International career
Castledine has represented England at under-15, under-17 and under-18 level.

Personal life
He is the son of former AFC Wimbledon footballer, and television presenter, Stewart Castledine, as well as former Homes Under the Hammer host Lucy Alexander.

Career statistics

Club

References

2005 births
Living people
Footballers from Kingston upon Thames
English footballers
England youth international footballers
Association football midfielders
Harlequin F.C. players
Chelsea F.C. players
AFC Wimbledon players